Kanjibhai Patel (born 30 March 1936) is an Indian politician of the Bharatiya Janata Party and a member of the Parliament of India representing Gujarat in the Rajya Sabha, the upper house of the Indian Parliament. He was for the term 03/04/2006 to 02/04/2012.

He resides at Bodvank in Chikhli Taluka of Navasari district.

External links
 Profile on Rajya Sabha website

References

Living people
1936 births
Bharatiya Janata Party politicians from Gujarat
Rajya Sabha members from Gujarat
People from Navsari district